The following are the national records in Olympic weightlifting in Cuba. Records are maintained in each weight class for the snatch lift, clean and jerk lift, and the total for both lifts by the  Federación Cubana de Levantamiento de Pesas.

Current records

Men

Women

Historical records

Men (1998–2018)

References

Cuba
records
Olympic weightlifting
weightlifting